Arzet (also Romanized as Arẕet; also known as Erzer) is a village in Shohada Rural District, Yaneh Sar District, Behshahr County, Mazandaran Province, Iran. At the 2006 census, its population was 540, in 133 families.

References 

Populated places in Behshahr County